Dukezong or Dorkhar is a Tibetan town in Shangri-la County, Dêqên Tibetan Autonomous Prefecture, Yunnan province, China.

History
The town is over thirteen hundred years old. In January 2014, a fire lasting over ten hours broke out destroying most of the town. There were no injuries or deaths reported, but over two thousand six hundred people had to be evacuated. Many buildings, including one statue that was from the seventeenth century, were destroyed.

References

Shangri-La
Towns in China
Destroyed towns